The black musselcracker (Cymatoceps nasutus) is a South African species of marine fish in the family Sparidae. It is the only species of its genus Cymatoceps. It reaches  in length and almost  in weight.

The black musselcracker is a popular sport fish in South Africa. Because it is eagerly sought after, this species experiences a lot of over harvesting, which diminishes its chances of a stable population. The reason that black musselcracker is vulnerable to over harvesting is mainly because they have a slow growth rate, which means that they are most likely being harvested before they are old enough to reproduce.

As a result of over harvesting the black musselcracker, there are now fishing regulations to protect this species. The primary rule is that each fisherman is allowed only one fish, minimum length of 50 centimeters, per day. Because of these new regulations, in some regions of South Africa, black musselcracker populations are on the rise.

References

External links
 
 
 
 
 

Sparidae
Taxa named by François-Louis Laporte, comte de Castelnau
Fish described in 1861
Monotypic ray-finned fish genera